This is a list of notable Serbian Canadians, that is, notable Canadian citizens of ethnic Serb descent.

To be included in this list, the person must have a Wikipedia article showing they are Serbian Canadian or must have references showing they are Serbian Canadians and are notable.

Arts and Entertainment
 Alex Lifeson, rock guitarist for Rush
 Stana Katic, Hollywood actress
 Dan Petronijevic, Canadian actor
 Nina Kiri, Hollywood actress
 Emilija Baranac, Hollywood actress
 Lolita Davidovich, Hollywood actress
 Mike Dopud, Hollywood actor
 Luigi von Kunits, conductor, founder of the Toronto Symphony Orchestra
 Ana Sokolovic, music composer
 Sasa Radulovic (architect), award-winning architect
 Bojana Sentaler, fashion designer
 Ivy Jenkins, Metal bass player, fashion designer
 Tijana Arnautović, Miss Canada 2004
 Bratsa Bonifacho, artist
 Viktor Mitic, artist
 Alexander Zonjic, flutist, music radio host
 Philippe Djokic, violinist, conductor
 Denise Djokic, cellist
 Vessna Perunovich, visual artist
 Lilly Otasevic, sculptor, artist

Media and Literature
 Ben Mulroney, television host
 Saša Petricic, award-winning CBC journalist
 Jelena Adzic, CBC arts reporter
 Boris Spremo, award-winning photojournalist
 Alex Mihailovich, television journalist
 Brian Linehan, television host
 Ogden Gavanski, film producer
 Dragan Todorović, journalist, author 
 Anica Nonveiller, journalist, writer, producer
 Boris Malagurski, documentary director, producer
 Adam Pribićević, journalist, writer, politician
 Dušan Petričić, illustrator and caricaturist (Toronto Star, New York Times)
 Prvoslav Vujcic, writer
 Nina Bunjevac, cartoonist

Academia and Politics
 Mila Mulroney, wife of Brian Mulroney (18th Prime Minister of Canada) 
 Caroline Mulroney, politician
 Bob Bratina, politician, radio host
 Tom Rakocevic, politician
 Maja Vodanovic, politician
 Jody Mitic, politician, motivational speaker for veterans
 Stevo Todorčević, mathematician, University of Toronto professor, a fellow of the Royal Society of Canada
 Miloš Mladenović, professor at McGill University, a political expert
 Sofija Skoric, librarian, activist, and founder of The Serbian Heritage Academy
 Miodrag Kojadinović, writer, an expert on gender/LGBT studies
 Gordana Lazarevich, musicologist, university department head 
 Vesna Milosevic-Zdjelar, astrophysicist, science educator
 Radoje Knežević, a member of a group that organized the Yugoslav coup d'état of 27 March 1941
 Ivan Avakumović, professor at the University of British Columbia

Military
 Nicholas Ribic, who fought in the Bosnian Serb Army during the Bosnian War

Sports

Ice Hockey
 Sasha Lakovic, ice hockey left winger (NHL/AHL)
 Milan Lucic, ice hockey left winger (NHL/WHL)
 Peter Zezel, ice hockey centre (NHL)
 Mick Vukota, ice hockey right winger (NHL)
 Savo Mitrovic, ice hockey player
 Stan Smrke, ice hockey player (NHL)
 Adrien Plavsic, ice hockey defenceman (NHL) 
 Alex Petrovic, ice hockey defense-man
 Ivan Boldirev,  ice hockey player (NHL)
 Dan Kesa, ice hockey player (NHL) 
 Milan Marcetta, ice hockey player (NHL), played during the 1967 Stanley Cup Playoffs
 Daniel Vukovic, ice hockey player
 Alex Andjelic, ice hockey coach

Tennis
 Milos Raonic, tennis player
 Daniel Nestor, tennis player
 Frank Dancevic, tennis player

Football
 Bob O'Billovich, CFL football player, CFL executive and coach
 Nick Bastaja, CFL football offensive lineman
 Chris Cvetkovic, CFL football player
 Mike Dopud, CFL football player 
 Lou Zivkovich, CFL football player
 Roy Jokanovich, CFL football player

Soccer
 Mike Bakić,  soccer player 
 Mike Stojanović, soccer player
 Jovan Blagojevic, soccer player
 Milan Božić, soccer player
 Aleksa Marković, soccer player
 Goran Miscevic, soccer player, coach
 Darko Kolić, soccer player, coach
 Miloš Kocić, soccer goalkeeper
 Milan Borjan, soccer goalkeeper
 Milovan Kapor, soccer player
 Dejan Jakovic, soccer player
 Niki Budalić, soccer player, general manager
 Stefan Cebara, soccer player
 Srdjan Djekanović, soccer goalkeeper
 Marko Aleksic, soccer player
 Boban Kajgo, soccer player
 Nikola Paunic, soccer player
 Uroš Stamatović, soccer player, coach
 Stefan Mitrović, soccer player
 Stefan Karajovanovic, soccer player

Basketball
 Mike Brkovich, basketball player
 Stefan Jankovic, basketball player
 Dejan Kravić, basketball player
 Lazar Kojović, basketball player
 Vladimir Kuljanin, basketball player
 Nemanja Mitrović, basketball player
 Stephany Skrba, basketball player

Wrestling and Boxing
 Neven Pajkić, heavyweight boxer
 Jelena Mrdjenovich, boxer, WBC/WIBF super featherweight title
 Bob Bozic, heavyweight boxer
 Bronko Lubich, wrestler, referee
 James Trifunov, wrestler, represented Canada in the Olympic Games
 Nick Cvjetkovich, professional wrestler

Other sports
 Milan Vukadinov, master chess player
 Igor Zugic, chess champion, Canadian International Master of Chess
 Sasa Palamarevic, water polo player
 Ryan Radmanovich, MLB baseball player
 Zoran Kosanović, table tennis player
 Nenad Gajic, lacrosse player
 Nick Zoricic, ski-cross competitor
 Zachary Plavsic,  sailor athlete
 Ljiljana Ljubisic, paralympic athlete
 Slobodan Misic-Brenda, Quebec handball trainer and author
 Nenad Medić, poker player
 Eli Sukunda, represented Canada in the 1976 Montreal Olympics in fencing.

Other
 Rebecca MacDonald (Ubavka Mitić), businesswoman
 Black Mike Winage, miner, an original settler in the Yukon, centenarian
 Boban Stojanović, LGBT advocate
 Sasa Radulovic, businessman, software engineer, politician
 Nick Borkovich, Superior Court justice, Hamilton, Ontario
 Paul von Baich, portrait and wildlife photographer
 Georgije Đokić, the first Bishop of the Serbian Orthodox Eparchy of Canada, now retired
 Mitrofan Kodić, the current bishop of the Serbian Orthodox Eparchy of Canada

See also
 List of Serbian Americans
 List of Serbs

References

 
Canadians
Canadians